Paradise Valley Historic District is a national historic district located in East Bradford Township, Chester County, Pennsylvania. It encompasses 25 contributing buildings, 10 contributing sites, and 10 contributing structures in rural Chester County. It includes a variety of vernacular stone farmhouses, bank barns, farm outbuildings, a stone bridge, two mill races, and a small family graveyard. Notable properties include the William Mercer Farm, Samuel Starr Farm, George Jefferis Farm, Thomas Price Farm, Spackman's Mill site, Hannum Mill site, and Enoch Pearson Farm.

It was added to the National Register of Historic Places in 1992.

References

Historic districts on the National Register of Historic Places in Pennsylvania
Historic districts in Chester County, Pennsylvania
National Register of Historic Places in Chester County, Pennsylvania